Aoraia is a genus of moths of the family Hepialidae. There are 13 described species, all endemic to New Zealand. The type species of this genus is Porina dinodes Meyrick, 1890.  This genus contains some large species with a wingspan of up to 150 mm.

Species 
 Aoraia aspina
 Aoraia aurimaculata
 Aoraia dinodes
 Aoraia ensyii
 Aoraia flavida
 Aoraia hespera
 Aoraia insularis – confined to Stewart Island/Rakiura & the small islands off Stewart Island/Rakiura.
 Aoraia lenis
 Aoraia macropis
 Aoraia oreobolae
 Aoraia orientalis
 Aoraia rufivena
 Aoraia senex

Buller's moth 
Buller's moth (Aoraia mairi) is possibly extinct and the description of this moth remains in doubt as the only recorded specimen, taken in 1867, has been lost.

References

External links
 Hepialidae genera

Hepialidae
Moths of New Zealand
Taxa named by Lionel Jack Dumbleton
Exoporia genera
Endemic fauna of New Zealand
Endemic moths of New Zealand